The greater necklaced laughingthrush (Pterorhinus pectoralis) is a species of passerine bird in the family Leiothrichidae. It is found in Bangladesh, Bhutan, China, India, Laos, Myanmar, Nepal, Thailand and Vietnam. It is introduced to the United States. Its natural habitats are subtropical or tropical moist lowland forest and subtropical or tropical moist montane forest.

This species was formerly placed in the genus Garrulax but following the publication of a comprehensive molecular phylogenetic study in 2018, it was moved to the resurrected genus Pterorhinus.

Gallery

References

External links

greater necklaced laughingthrush
Birds of China
Birds of Eastern Himalaya
Birds of Southeast Asia
greater necklaced laughingthrush
Taxonomy articles created by Polbot
Taxobox binomials not recognized by IUCN